Joseph Vincent Lo Truglio (born December 2, 1970) is an American actor, comedian, writer and producer. Best known for his role as Charles Boyle on the Fox/NBC sitcom Brooklyn Nine-Nine, he also was a cast member on the television series The State and Reno 911!. His notable film roles include Wet Hot American Summer, I Love You Man, Superbad, Paul, Role Models and Wanderlust.

Early life
Joseph Lo Truglio was born in the Ozone Park neighborhood of Queens, New York, on December 2, 1970. He is of Italian and Irish descent. He grew up in Margate, Florida, and graduated from Coconut Creek High School. He met many of his future The State cast members at New York University, where he took part in the school's sketch comedy group.

Career

Lo Truglio wrote and acted in various skits for The State, and animated segments for the show. After The State ended in 1995, he made a number of guest appearances throughout the late 1990s on shows such as Viva Variety, Upright Citizens Brigade, Law & Order and Third Watch.

In 2001, Lo Truglio appeared in fellow State alumnus David Wain's comedy film Wet Hot American Summer, where he played a camp counselor. He made cameo appearances on David Wain, Michael Showalter, and Michael Ian Black's online Stella shorts series.

He appeared in the 2005 Comedy Central show Stella and had a cameo in Showalter's film The Baxter. He made cameos on Reno 911!, as well as in the 2007 movie, Reno 911!: Miami. He has provided his voice for several video games including The Warriors. In 2005, he provided the voice of Vincenzo 'Lucky' Cilli in Grand Theft Auto: Liberty City Stories. In 2006 he had a supporting role in Artie Lange's Beer League.

Lo Truglio has appeared in several television commercials, including spots for Gateway Computer and Jack Link's Beef Jerky.

He portrayed "Francis the Driver" in the Judd Apatow hit comedy Superbad and had supporting roles in films such as Pineapple Express, Paul, Role Models, Wanderlust, and I Love You, Man. In July 2008, Lo Truglio starred with Bill Hader and Jason Sudeikis in the web series The Line on Crackle. He has appeared on the comedy podcasts Comedy Bang Bang, Never Not Funny, and Superego.

Lo Truglio appeared on the Starz comedy Party Down and also had a recurring role on the short-lived 2010 Fox sitcom Sons of Tucson. In 2011, he co-starred in the short-lived NBC comedy series Free Agents starring Hank Azaria. Lo Truglio provided the voice of Freddy in the American Dad! episode "Stan's Best Friend." In 2013, Lo Truglio began co-starring opposite Andy Samberg and Andre Braugher on the Fox comedy series Brooklyn Nine-Nine.

Lo Truglio reprised his role as Neil in the eight-episode Netflix series Wet Hot American Summer: First Day of Camp, the prequel to the 2001 film Wet Hot American Summer. The series premiered on July 31, 2015.

Personal life
Lo Truglio married actress Beth Dover on April 19, 2014, having gotten engaged in 2013. They co-starred in the Brooklyn Nine-Nine episode "Fancy Brudgom" and in the third season of Burning Love, as well as two episodes of the TV series Wet Hot American Summer: First Day of Camp. They have a son named Eli.

Filmography

Film

Television

Video games

References

External links
 
 

Living people
1970 births
20th-century American comedians
20th-century American male actors
21st-century American comedians
21st-century American male actors
American sketch comedians
American male comedians
American male film actors
American male stage actors
American male television actors
American male television writers
American male video game actors
American male voice actors
American people of Irish descent
American television writers
American writers of Italian descent
Comedians from New York City
Male actors from Florida
Male actors from New York City
New York University alumni
People from Margate, Florida
People from Queens, New York
People of Sicilian descent
Screenwriters from Florida
Screenwriters from New York (state)
Television producers from Florida
Television producers from New York City